Al-Khazneh ("The Treasury") is one of the most elaborate temples in Petra, a city of the Nabatean Kingdom inhabited by the Arabs in ancient times. As with most of the other buildings in this ancient town, including the Monastery (Arabic: Ad Deir), this structure was carved out of a sandstone rock face.

The structure is believed to have been the mausoleum of the Nabatean King Aretas IV in the 1st century AD. It is one of the most popular tourist attractions in both Jordan and the region. It became known as "Al-Khazneh", or The Treasury, in the early 19th century by the area's Bedouins as they had believed it contained treasures.

Name
Al-Khazneh means "The Treasury" in Arabic, a name derived from legends regarding the decorative stone urn high on the second level, which in reality is solid sandstone.

One legend is that the Egyptian Pharaoh and some of his armies escaped the closing of the Red Sea, created the Khazneh by magic as a safe place for his treasury, and continued in his pursuit of Moses. This led to the name Khazneh el-Far'oun, "Treasury of the Pharaoh".

Swiss explorer Johann Ludwig Burckhardt wrote of another local legend that "ancient pharaonic treasures" were hidden in the urn. Significant damage from bullets can be seen on the urn, which the Jordanian government attributes to Bedouins who believed the legend.

History
Al-Khazneh was originally built as a mausoleum and crypt at the beginning of the 1st century AD during the reign of Aretas IV Philopatris.

Many of the building's architectural details have eroded away during the two thousand years since it was carved and sculpted from the cliff. The sculptures are thought to be those of various mythological figures associated with the afterlife. On top are figures of four eagles that would carry away the souls. The figures on the upper level are dancing Amazons with double-axes. The entrance is flanked by statues of the twins Castor and Pollux who lived partly on Olympus and partly in the underworld.

Impact of tourism

In 1812, the city of Petra and Al-Khazneh was rediscovered by Swiss explorer Burckhardt. As Western Europe continued to explore the Middle East, tourism became more common, and by the 1920s, a small hotel had opened near Petra. While Petra was not as popular as larger, more central cities like Cairo, tourism started to change the economy and social structure of the Bedouin people who lived nearby.

Tourism is now the main source of income in Jordan. Hotels, souvenir shops, restaurants and horse rental services are all found within a few-mile radius of Petra itself. While the economic effects have been largely positive, the site faces threats from the increased tourism.

Humidity from large crowds of people visiting the site can cause damage to the dry sandstone. White spots have appeared on walls and columns from stearic acid deposition due to hands resting against the walls. The Khazneh surface itself has receded by 40 mm in less than ten years from touching, leaning, or rubbing on the walls.

In popular culture
The Treasury has appeared in many Hollywood films, gaining particular fame after being featured in climactic scenes in the 1989 film Indiana Jones and the Last Crusade, in which its facade is represented as the entrance to the final resting place of the Holy Grail. The interior scenes of the temple were filmed at Elstree Studios in England.

PBS's Nova Special Lost City of Stone and Ancient Megastructures: Petra, television series from PBS and National, were dedicated to the Khazneh, and to the theories of Nabatean construction techniques and engineering.

The Treasury is also depicted in Hergé's The Red Sea Sharks, one of the Adventures of Tintin, Sinbad and the Eye of the Tiger, Sky 1 travel series An Idiot Abroad, The Sisters of Mercy 1988 music video for "Dominion", the history series The Naked Archeologist, the Korean drama Misaeng, the video game Overwatch, and Mortal Kombat: Annihilation. In the 2007 video game Assassin's Creed, the relief where Altaïr Ibn-La'Ahad confronts Robert de Sable in the Jerusalem Vault is modeled after The Treasury.

3D model with laser scanning 

The Treasury was spatially documented in 2012 by the non-profit research group Zamani Project, which specialises in 3D digital documentation of tangible cultural heritage. A 3D model can be viewed at zamaniproject.org. The data generated by the Zamani Project create a permanent record that can be used for research, education, restoration, and conservation.

See also
 Biblical archaeology
 List of megalithic sites

References

External links

"Solving the Enigma of Petra and the Nabataeans" Biblical Archaeology Review
Over 110 pictures, many details
A three-dimensional representation of the temple.

Tourism in Jordan
Temples in Jordan
Petra
Arabic architecture
Nabataean architecture